The Episcopal Diocese of Central New York is a diocese of the Episcopal Church in the United States of America encompassing the area in the center of New York state. It is one of ten dioceses, plus the Convocation of Episcopal Churches in Europe, that make up Province 2 of the Episcopal Church in the United States of America.

The diocesan bishop is DeDe Duncan-Probe, eleventh bishop of Central New York, and the diocese's first female bishop. Youth ministry includes C.A.R.E. which makes mission trips.

As of 2013 the diocese had a membership of 12,307 down from 21,000 in 2003.

List of bishops

References

External links
Official website of the Episcopal Diocese of Central New York
Journal of the Annual Convention, Diocese of Central New York
A Short History of Saint Andrew's Divinity School at Syracuse, New York (1910)

Central New York
Central New York
1869 establishments in New York (state)
Province 2 of the Episcopal Church (United States)